Bryan Yipp is a Canadian biologist focusing in critical care medicine and internal medicine, currently a Canada Research Chair at University of Calgary.

References

Year of birth missing (living people)
Living people
Academic staff of the University of Calgary
Canadian molecular biologists
University of Calgary alumni